Orlando City may refer to:
 Orlando, Florida, a city in the U.S. state of Florida
 Orlando City SC (2010–14), an American professional soccer club in Orlando, Florida, that played in the USL Pro league
 Orlando City SC, an American professional soccer club in Orlando, Florida, a Major League Soccer (MLS) franchise